The Callaway Golf PGA Junior Series began in 1996, and has attracted boy and girl golfers representing 50 states, the District of Columbia, 22 countries/territories and international players. The Callaway Golf PGA Junior Series is organized and conducted by the Professional Golfers' Association of America.

References
 Official Site 
 PGA Junior Golf 

1996 establishments in the United States
Golf associations
Golf in the United States